Choristoneura longicellanus is a species of moth of the family Tortricidae. It is found in China (Heilongjiang, Inner Mongolia, Shandong, Anhui, Hubei, Hunan, Jiangxi, Jiangsu, Sichuan, Yunnan), Japan, Taiwan, the Korean Peninsula and the Russian Far East.

The wingspan is 19–25 mm for males and 19–31 mm for females.  Adults have been recorded on wing from July and August.

The larvae feed on Castanea (including Castanea crenata), Morus, Malus (including Malus pumila), Pyrus (including Pyrus ussuriensis, Pyrus pyrifolia) and Rosa species, as well as Fragaria × ananassa, Quercus acutissima, Quercus aliena, Quercus dentata, Quercus mongolica, Quercus serrata, Quercus variabilis, Ribes uva-crispa, Ligustrum obtusifolium, Prunus persica, Prunus salicina and Prunus × yedoensis. The larvae live in large rolled leaves. Older larvae are green with a black head. The species overwinters as a young larva in dry leaves. Pupation takes place in foliage on the ground.
Larvae have been recorded from May to July.

References

Moths described in 1900
Choristoneura